Antonio Manuel Salcedo (15 October 1912 – 11 June 1993) was a Filipino sprinter. He competed in the men's 100 metres and the men's 200 metres at the 1936 Summer Olympics.

References

External links
 

1912 births
1993 deaths
Athletes (track and field) at the 1936 Summer Olympics
Filipino male sprinters
Olympic track and field athletes of the Philippines
Place of birth missing